The Triumph Tiger 955i (T709EN) is a dual-sport motorcycle that was produced by Triumph Motorcycles between 2001 and 2006.

It was the successor of the visually similar 885 cc Tiger T709 (1999–2000) which was also fuel injected but with a different engine, 885 instead of 955. It was later superseded by the Triumph Tiger 1050 in 2007.

The Triumph Tiger range of motorcycles was notable for its use of plastic as a material for its fuel tank.

Tiger Models Overview

See also
List of Triumph motorcycles
Tiger 900

References

External links

 2005 model specifications

Tiger 955i
Dual-sport motorcycles
Motorcycles introduced in 2001